In common law, the principle of prosecutorial discretion allows public prosecutors a wide latitude to decide whether or not to charge a person for a crime, and which charges to file. A similar principle in continental law countries is called the principle of opportunity.

The principle of opportunity is encoded in law in The Netherlands, Germany, Sweden, Slovenia and France. By contrast, in the countries that do not recognise the principle of opportunity, compulsory prosecution applies, and the cancellation of the prosecution of a known felony can itself be considered a felony.

By country

United States
In the United States federal system, the prosecutor has wide latitude in determining when, who, how, and even whether to prosecute for apparent violations of federal criminal law. The prosecutor's broad discretion in such areas as initiating or forgoing prosecutions, selecting or recommending specific charges, and terminating prosecutions by accepting guilty pleas has been recognized on numerous occasions by the courts. Prosecutors may decide not to press the charges even when there is probable cause, if they determine that there is no reasonable likelihood of conviction. Prosecutors may dismiss charges in this situation by seeking a voluntary dismissal or nolle prosequi.

Wayte v. United States 470 U.S. 598 (1985) said:In our criminal justice system, the Government retains "broad discretion" as to whom to prosecute. [...] This broad discretion rests largely on the recognition that the decision to prosecute is particularly ill-suited to judicial review. Such factors as the strength of the case, the prosecution's general deterrence value, the Government's enforcement priorities, and the case's relationship to the Government's overall enforcement plan are not readily susceptible to the kind of analysis the courts are competent to undertake.Yick Wo v. Hopkins (1886) was the first case where the United States Supreme Court  ruled that a law that is race-neutral on its face, but is administered in a prejudicial manner, is an infringement of the Equal Protection Clause in the Fourteenth Amendment to the U.S. Constitution.

France 

The Netherlands 

In Dutch law it is called , lit.'principle of opportunity'. Cancelling the prosecution of a crime is called a sepot or seponering in Dutch and is mentioned in the First Book, First Title, Fourth Section of the Dutch Criminal Procedure Code (Articles 12, 12a, 12b, 12c, 12d, 12e, 12f, 12g, 12h, 12i, 12j, 12k, 12l, 12m, 12n, 12o, 12p, 13 and 13a).

There are three sorts of cancellation of prosecution:

 policy sepot: petty crimes are not prosecuted to free up capacity in the legal system and to prosecute serious crimes.
 technical sepot: there is not enough evidence to obtain a conviction from a court or such a conviction is highly unlikely.
 conditional sepot: the crime suspect is spared from being prosecuted if the suspect commits no other crimes. In Belgium, that is called a "praetorian probation".

A crime whose prosecution is cancelled can still be resumed later (the ne bis in idem principle does not apply to sepots), unless the Public Department has made a formal communication to the crime suspect that the suspect is no longer prosecuted (then, prosecution cannot be resumed according to the principle of administrative law trustworthiness).

According to Article 12 of the Dutch Criminal Procedure Code, a person with a direct concern in the prosecution of a crime may file a complaint at a court of law against the cancellation of the prosecution. If the council chamber of the court decides that the crime should be prosecuted, the crime must be prosecuted.

Germany 

In German law, it is called , lit.'opportunity principle'.

Singapore 

Under Article 35(8) of the Constitution of Singapore, as well as Section 11 of the Criminal Procedure Code, the Attorney-General of Singapore is also the Public Prosecutor. Deputy Public Prosecutors (DPPs) and Assistant Public Prosecutors (APPs), legal officers from the Attorney-General's Chambers (AGC) Crime Division, act under the authority of the Public Prosecutor. As Public Prosecutor, the Attorney-General has prosecutorial discretion; i.e. he may, at his discretion, institute, conduct or discontinue any proceedings for any offense.

Prosecutorial discretion grants AGC the power to institute, conduct or discontinue any prosecution at his discretion. The prosecution bears the burden of proof and is required to prove its case beyond a reasonable doubt. This means that in order for a defendant to be found guilty, the case presented by the prosecution must be enough to remove any reasonable doubt in the mind of the judge(s) that the defendant is guilty of the crime with which he/she is charged.

Works cited

References 
 Notes

 Citations

See also 
Nolle prosequi, a generalised form of the principle of opportunity
Selective enforcement, a general principle of law enforcement
Selective prosecution, a defense strategy claiming discrimination

Legal doctrines and principles

ro:Principiul oportunității